Qeshlaq-e Damirchluy-e Qarah Qeshlaq may refer to:
 Qeshlaq-e Damirchluy-e Qarah Qeshlaq Hajj Abil
 Qeshlaq-e Damirchluy-e Qarah Qeshlaq-e Hajj Majid